Abdil Qaiyyim bin Abdul Mutalib (born 14 May 1989) is a Singaporean professional footballer who last played as a centre-back for Geylang International FC in the S.League, Singapore's top tier of professional football.

Youth career 
Abdil signed for local S.League side Warriors FC's youth team at the age of 15 in 2004, until he left to join the Young Lions in 2007.

Club career

Young Lions 
In 2007, Abdil moved from Warriors FC to join Young Lions on a professional contract. He had to wait until 3 August 2009, when he made his debut appearance for the club in a S.League fixture against the Super Reds. The match ended in a 1–1 draw.

Home United 
Abdil joined S.League side Home United for the 2011 S.League season, making a total of 14 competitive appearances in his stint at the club.

LionsXII 
On 14 April 2012, Robin Chitrakar, coach of the Young Lions at that time, confirmed the departure of Abdil from the club to join the LionsXII in the 2012 Malaysia Super League. Abdil however, only managed to make a total of 5 competitive appearances for the team in the entirety of his stint.

Warriors FC 
Following the underwhelming stint with the LionsXII in the Malaysia Super League, Abdil returned from abroad to rejoin his boyhood club Warriors FC for the 2013 S.League season. Abdil cited his wish to challenge for honors and silverware as his reason for returning to the youth club where he began his footballing career. Abdil made his professional debut on 21 February 2013 in the first match of the season against Woodlands Wellington, with the fixture ending in a 2–2 draw.

On 19 February 2014, Abdil's contract with the Warriors FC was officially terminated, with a misunderstanding between the player and the club's general manager Chong Wei Chiang over a right knee injury, and the player's performance in the league's mandatory fitness test cited as primary reasons for the termination.

Tampines Rovers 
Following Abdil's contract termination by Warriors FC, he agreed professional terms and signed a one-year contract with Tampines Rovers, the defending champions of the 2013 S.League season. On 21 February 2014, Abdil made his debut for the Stags in the 2014 Singapore Community Shield fixture.

Home United 
Abdil rejoined Home United for the 2015 S.League season, making his second debut for the Protectors on 3 March 2015, in a match against Geylang International. The match ended in a 1–1 draw. Abdil earned plaudits with his performances for the club, and was awarded consecutive Man of the Match accolades for his appearances in a Singapore Cup fixture against his boyhood club Warriors FC, as well as a S.League fixture against Japanese satellite club Albirex Niigata (S). Abdil was retained by the club following the conclusion of the season to continue playing with the Protectors in the 2016 S.League season.

Geylang International FC 
On 2 June 2021, Abdil signed for Geylang International on a permanent transfer from Lion City Sailors for the remainder of the 2021 season.

Career statistics 
19 March 2022

Honours

Club 
 AFC West Zone
 Champions 2018
 Singapore League
 Runner Up 2018
 Singapore Cup
 Winner: 2011
 Runner-up: 2015
 Singapore Community Shield
 Winner: 2014

References

External links 
 

Singapore international footballers
Singaporean footballers
1989 births
Living people
Association football defenders
Warriors FC players
Home United FC players
Tampines Rovers FC players
LionsXII players
Singapore Premier League players
Malaysia Super League players
Lion City Sailors FC players